Siddhashila is an area in Jain cosmology at the apex of the universe, which is where the Jains believe people who have become arihants and tirthankaras go after they die and attain moksha. Such people are called siddhas after they discard their mortal body, hence the origin of the term.

See also
 Kevala jnana
 Jainism and non-creationism
 Timeline of Jainism

References

Moksha
Jain cosmology